Dimanganese decacarbonyl, which has the chemical formula Mn2(CO)10, is a binary bimetallic carbonyl complex centered around the first row transition metal manganese. The first reported synthesis of Mn2(CO)10 was in 1954 at Linde Air Products Company and was performed by Brimm, Lynch, and Sesny. Their hypothesis about, and synthesis of, dimanganese decacarbonyl was fundamentally guided by the previously known dirhenium decacarbonyl (Re2(CO)10), the heavy atom analogue of Mn2(CO)10. Since its first synthesis, Mn2(CO)10 has been use sparingly as a reagent in the synthesis of other chemical species, but has found the most use as a simple system on which to study fundamental chemical and physical phenomena, most notably, the metal-metal bond. Dimanganese decacarbonyl is also used as a classic example to reinforce fundamental topics in organometallic chemistry like d-electron count, the 18-electron rule, oxidation state, valency, and the isolobal analogy.

Synthesis
Many procedures have been reported for the synthesis of Mn2(CO)10 since 1954, the two most common general types are discussed herein. Some of these methods were not designed to create Mn2(CO)10, but rather treat Mn(I), Mn(II), or Mn(-I) as an oxidizing or reducing agent, respectively, for other species in the reaction, but produce Mn2(CO)10 nonetheless.

Reduction/carbonylation syntheses 
The carbonylation route involves the reduction of a Mn(I) or Mn(II) salt to the Mn(0) species in concert with carbonylation to a coordinatively saturated metal center with CO gas. The carbonylation using CO can be under heightened pressures of CO, relative to atmospheric pressure, or at ambient pressure. Examples of each are given.

High pressure carbonylation 
As previously mentioned, Mn2(CO)10 was first prepared in 1954 by Brimm, Lynch, and Sesny, albeit in yields of ~1%, by the reduction of manganese(II) iodide with magnesium(0) under 3000 psi (~200 atm) of carbon monoxide (CO). The balanced reaction is represented by:2 MnI2 + 2 Mg + 10 CO -> Mn2(CO)10 + 2 MgI2A more efficient preparation was developed in 1958 and entails reduction of anhydrous manganese(II) chloride with sodium benzophenone ketyl radical under similarly high pressures (200 atm) of CO. This method yielded ~32% of the dimanganese decacarbonyl complex, producing enough material for the first real opportunities to rigorously study the chemical and physical properties of the molecule. This method is represented by the balanced equation:

Low pressure carbonylation 
Despite successes in the synthesis of Mn2(CO)10, the safety concerns and limited batch size surrounding high pressure carbonylation methods necessitated alternative, low pressure procedures to obtain the target compound. In 1968, the first ambient CO pressure carbonylation synthesis of Mn2(CO)10 was reported from the commercially available and inexpensive methylcyclopentadienyl manganese tricarbonyl (MMT) and sodium(0) as the reductant. The balanced equation being:2 Mn(\eta^5-(CH3)C5H4)(CO)3 + 2 Na + 4 CO -> Mn2(CO)10 + Na[(CH3)C5H4]The efficiency of the method ranged from 16 to 20% yield, lower than what was previously reported, however, it could be performed more safely and on mole scale.

Dimerization syntheses 
The second overarching method used to make Mn2(CO)10 is similar to the first in that it usually requires alteration of a Mn(I), or in this case, Mn(-I) to the corresponding Mn(0) species. These preparations differ, however, by beginning with manganese precursors, sometimes commercially available, that need no additional CO ligands and simply dimerize to form the target molecule. This poses the significant logistic and safety advantage of not dealing with toxic CO gas and is the prevailing general method for the academic synthesis of Mn2(CO)10.

The first explicit success in this area was published in 1977, which featured a pentacarbonylhydridomanganese(I) Mn source, with Se(PF2)2 as the reductant. The balanced equation for this transformation is:2 Mn(CO)5(H) + Se(PF2)2 -> Mn2(CO)10 + PF2H + Se=PF2HAlterations of the terminal reductant have been reported in the manganese hydride case. Similar methods exist for Mn(CO)5X compounds where X = Cl, Br, or I, and more rarely, Mn(CO)6 bound with a weakly coordinating anion.
Using similar logic, stable salts of the pentacarbonyl manganate anion can also be employed with an oxidant to access the same Mn2(CO)10 complex. An example of this is the reduction of triphenylcyclopropenium tetrafluoroborate with sodium pentacarbonyl manganate to produce the dimer of each. The balanced equation is given by:

One additional interesting synthesis of Mn2(CO)10 occurs by combination of a hexacarbonylmanganese(I) tetrafluoroborate salt with a sodium pentacarbonyl manganate salt. In this instance, manganese is both the oxidant and reductant, producing two formal Mn(0) atoms. The balanced equation is:[Mn(CO)6](BF4) + Na[Mn(CO)5] -> Mn2(CO)10 + Na[BF4]

Structure and bonding
High precision crystallographic and theoretical studies of the physical and electronic structures of Mn2(CO)10 have been performed and are discussed with respect to the published literature below, however, a qualitative approach can also be taken to predict its constitutional structure using fundamental principles of inorganic and organometallic chemistry.

The stoichiometric composition of Mn2(CO)10, derived from elemental analysis, informs a 5:1 ratio of CO to Mn. The assumed binary carbonyl complex given this information is pentacarbonylmanganese(0). However, the sum of the d-electron count (7 for Mn(0)) and the electron contributions from the ligands (10 for 5 CO) yields a 17-electron, metalloradical complex for Mn(CO)5. This is a highly unstable configuration, isolobal to the methyl radical, which can be expected to homodimerize to the constitutionally symmetric dinuclear complex in order for both Mn nuclei to achieve an 18-electron, noble gas configuration. Indeed, the true structure of the Mn(0) binary carbonyl structure is a dimeric, dinuclear complex.

Crystal structure 
This hypothesized structure was confirmed explicitly through x-ray diffraction studies, first in two dimensions in 1957, followed by its single crystal three-dimensional analysis in 1963. The crystal structure of Mn2(CO)10 was redetermined at high precision at room temperature in 1981 and bond lengths mentioned herein refer to results from that study. Mn2(CO)10 has no bridging CO ligands: it can be described as containing two axially-linked (CO)5Mn- subunits. These Mn subunits are spaced at a distance of 290.38(6) pm, a bonding distance that is longer than that predicted by Pekka Pyykko. There are two kinds of CO ligands; one CO linked to each Mn atom that is coaxial with the Mn-Mn bond and four “equatorial” carbonyls bonded to each Mn atom that are nearly perpendicular to the Mn-Mn bond (Mn’-Mn-CO(equatorial) angles range from 84.61(7) to 89.16(7) degrees). The axial carbonyl distance of (181.1 pm) is 4.5 pm shorter than the average equatorial manganese-carbonyl distance of 185.6 pm. In the stable rotamer, the two Mn(CO)5 subunits are staggered. Thus, the overall molecule has approximate point group D4d symmetry, which is an uncommon symmetry shared with S2F10. The Mn2(CO)10 molecule is isomorphous with the other group 7 binary metal carbonyls Tc2(CO)10 and Re2(CO)10.

Electronic structure 
Initial fundamental experimental and theoretical studies on the electronic structure of Mn2(CO)10 were performed used a mixture of photoelectron spectroscopy, infrared spectroscopy, and an iterative extended-Hückel-type molecular orbital calculation. The electronic structure of Mn2(CO)10 was most reported in 2017 using the BP86D functional with TZP basis set. The electronic structure described herein, along with relevant orbital plots, are reproduced from the methods used in that study using Orca (5.0.3) and visualized using IBOView (v20150427). The two main interactions of interest in the system are the metal-to-ligand pi-backbonding interactions and the metal-metal sigma bonding orbital. The pi-backbonding interactions illustrated below occur between the t2g d-orbital set and the CO π* antibonding orbitals. The degenerate dxz and dyz backbonding interactions with both axial and equitorial CO ligands is the HOMO-15. More total delocalization occurs onto the axial CO antibonding orbital than does the equatorial, which is thought to rationalize the shorter Mn-C bond length.The primary Mn-Mn σ-bonding orbital is composed of two dz2 orbitals, represented by the HOMO-9.

Other large contributions made in this area were by Ahmed Zewail using ultrafast, femptosecond spectroscopy en route to his 1999 Nobel Prize. His discoveries elucidated much about the time scales and energies associated with the molecular motions of Mn2(CO)10, as well as the Mn-Mn and Mn-C bond cleavage events.

Reactivity
Mn2(CO)10 is air stable as a crystalline solid, but solutions require Schlenk techniques. Mn2(CO)10 is chemically active at both the Mn-Mn and Mn-CO bonds due to low, and surprisingly similar, bond dissociation energies of ~36 kcal/mol (151 kJ/mol) and ~38 kcal/mol (160 kJ/mol), respectively. For this reason, reactivity can happen at either site of the molecule, sometimes selectively. Examples of each are given.

Mn-Mn bond cleavage reactions 
The Mn-Mn bond is sensitive to both oxidation and reduction, producing two equivalents of the corresponding Mn(I) and Mn(-I) species, respectively. Both of the potential resultant species can be derived further. Redox neutral cleavage is possible both thermally and photochemically, producing two equivalents of the Mn(0) radical. Examples of each are given below.

Oxidative cleavage 
Selective mono-oxidation of the Mn-Mn bond is most often done via addition of classical metal oxidants (e.g. CeIV, PbIV, etc) or weak homonuclear single covalent bonds of the form X-X (X is group 16 or 17 element). These reactions yield the [Mn(CO)5]+ cation with a bound weakly coordinating anion, or the Mn(CO)5X complex. The general reaction schemes for each are seen as balanced equations below:Mn2(CO)10 + 2 M^{n}X_{n} -> 2Mn(CO)5X + 2M^{(n-1)}X_{(n-1)}or for two-electron oxidantsMn2(CO)10 + M^{n}X_{n} -> 2Mn(CO)5X + M^{(n-2)}X_{(n-2)}andMn2(CO)10 + RE-ER -> 2Mn(CO)5(ER)for E = O, S, Se, TeMn2(CO)10 + X-X -> 2Mn(CO)5Xfor X = F, Cl, Br, I

Reductive cleavage 
Reductive cleavage is almost always done with sodium metal, yielding the [Mn(CO)5]- anion with the sodium counterion. The balanced general reactions are given below:Mn2(CO)10 + 2 Na^{0} -> 2Na[Mn(CO)5]The resultant manganate anion is a potent nucleophile, which can be protonated to give the manganese hydride, or alkylated with organic halides to give a large swath of organomanganese(I) complexes.

Redox-neutral cleavage 
Homolytic cleavage, usually via light, but sometimes heat, gives the Mn(0) metalloradical, which can react with itself to reform Mn2(CO)10, or combine with other radical species that usually result in formal oxidation to Mn(I). This reactivity is comparable to that of organic, carbon-based radicals via the isolobal analogy. The homolytic cleavage is given by:Mn2(CO)10 + h\nu -> 2[Mn(CO)5]^{.}The use of the produced radical species, [Mn(CO)5]*, has found several applications as a radical initiator for various organic methodologies and polymerization reactions.

Ligand substitution reactions 
Ligand substitution reactions that do not disrupt the Mn-Mn bonding is done by using strongly sigma donating L-type ligands that can outcompete CO without participating in redox reactivity. This requirement usually necessitates phosphines or N-heterocyclic carbenes (NHCs), with substitution occurring at the axial position according to the reactions below:

Safety
Mn2(CO)10 is a volatile source of a metal and a source of CO.

References

Carbonyl complexes
Organomanganese compounds